Piratenpartei is the German expression for Pirate Party and may refer to:

 Piratenpartei Österreichs, Austria
 Piratenpartei Deutschland. Germany
 Piratenpartei Schweiz, Switzerland